USS Chafee (DDG-90) is an  guided missile destroyer in United States Navy. She is named for Senator John Lester Hubbard Chafee (1922–1999), a Marine veteran of Guadalcanal who also served as the Secretary of the Navy. Chafee was laid down by the Bath Iron Works in Bath, Maine on 12 April 2001, launched on 2 November 2002 and commissioned on 18 October 2003 in Newport, Rhode Island, the home state of the ship's namesake.

Service history
Chafee left her homeport of Pearl Harbor 20 May 2005 for her maiden deployment with the  Carrier Strike Group (CSG). She returned to her homeport after a regularly scheduled deployment in support of the Global War on Terrorism.

Chafee departed Pearl Harbor 9 April 2007, as part of the San Diego-based Nimitz CSG and deployed to the U.S 5th Fleet (C5F) area of operations. On 1 June 2007, Chafee fired her main gun at Al-Qaeda suspects in the Puntland region of Somalia. The men were wanted for the 1998 United States embassy bombings. Chafee returned home to Pearl Harbor on 22 September 2007, marking the end a successful 167-day Western Pacific and Middle East deployment.

Chafee is an active unit of the Pacific Fleet and operates out of Pearl Harbor, Hawaii; currently, Chafee is assigned to the  carrier group.

On 10 December 2020, It was reported that Chafee tested the Tomahawk Block V missile for the first time.

Chafee participated in RIMPAC 2022.

Awards
 Navy Meritorious Unit Commendation (May–Jun 2007, Apr 2012 – Dec 2013)
 Battle "E" (2007, 2012, 2013, 2014, 2015)
 Spokane Trophy Award (2006)
 Secretary of the Navy (SECNAV) Energy Conservation Award (Afloat category) (2015)

In popular culture
The destroyers were not referenced by name, but their numbers were visible on their bows.

Coat of arms

Shield 
A white anchor on a background of blue surrounded by a thin wavy white border, and then surrounded by a red border that is marked with thirteen gold stars.

The anchor—at the center of the shield—is borrowed from the Secretary of the Navy's Flag, in reference to John Chafee's time in that position. The thirteen stars is a reference to Rhode Island, Chafee's home state. The wavy border symbolizes the sea and Navy. The color white represents integrity. Blue and gold are the traditional colors of the navy, and the colors denote the sea the excellence, respectively. While the color red denotes courage.

Crest 
In gold, an eagle is holding a red serpent with its beak. The eagle is clutching arrows with its talons, and it is perched on a representation of the Senate Chamber of the Capitol Building. Behind the eagle, a Naval Officer's sword and a Marine Corps mameluke in saltire points upwards.  A laurel wreath serves as a back ground and encircles the eagle. The base of the crest is a blue and white decorative rope.

The two swords signify Chafee's military service in two wars, specifically the mameluke symbolizes his time in the Marine Corps. The laurel wreath is a symbol Chafee's honor and achievement during his time as a marine, Secretary of the Navy, senator and governor. The eagle is a reference to the senator's time as the Secretary of the Navy. As mentioned before, the color gold and red represents excellence and courage, respectively.

Motto 
Commanding the Seas.

Seal 
The coat of arms is the shield that topped with the crest. The coat of arms is then placed on a white background, and is surrounded by a dark blue oval that is bordered by a gold chain. The ship's name is inscribed at the top of the oval, and the hull number is inscribed at the bottom.

References

External links

 Official Ship's site

 

2002 ships
Arleigh Burke-class destroyers
Destroyers of the United States
Ships built in Bath, Maine